Shawnee High School may refer to one of several high schools in the United States:

Shawnee High School (Illinois) in Wolf Lake, Illinois
Shawnee High School (Kentucky) in Louisville, Kentucky
Shawnee High School (New Jersey) in Medford, New Jersey
Shawnee High School (Lima, Ohio) in Lima, Ohio
Shawnee High School (Springfield, Ohio) in Springfield, Ohio
Shawnee High School (Oklahoma) in Shawnee, Oklahoma
Shawnee Heights High School in Tecumseh, Kansas
Preble Shawnee High School in Camden, Ohio
Shawnee Mission East High School in Prairie Village, Kansas
Shawnee Mission North High School in Overland Park, Kansas
Shawnee Mission Northwest High School in Shawnee, Kansas
Shawnee Mission South High School in Overland Park, Kansas
Shawnee Mission West High School in Overland Park, Kansas